Charles Duncombe, 1st Baron Feversham (5 December 1764 – 16 July 1841), was a British Member of Parliament.

Biography
Feversham was born the eldest son of Charles Slingsby Duncombe of Duncombe Park and educated at Harrow school (1799).

Feversham was appointed High Sheriff of Yorkshire in 1790. He was elected to the House of Commons for Shaftesbury in 1790, a seat he held until 1796, and then represented Aldborough from 1796 to 1806, Heytesbury from 1812 to 1816 and Newport, Isle of Wight from 1818 to 1826. However, he never held ministerial office. On 14 July 1826 he was raised to the peerage as Baron Feversham, of Duncombe Park in the County of York.

Marriage and children
Lord Feversham married Lady Charlotte Legge, daughter of William Legge, 2nd Earl of Dartmouth, in 1795. They had eight children together:

 Hon. Frances Duncombe (born 30 May 1803, died 15 June 1881)
 Hon. Louisa Duncombe (born 16 November 1807, died 18 November 1852)
 Charles Duncombe (born 29 July 1796, died 2 April 1819)
 William Duncombe, 2nd Baron Feversham (born 14 January 1798, died 11 February 1867)
 The Reverend and Hon. Henry Duncombe (born 25 August 1800, died 1 October 1832)
 Admiral the Hon. Arthur Duncombe (born 24 March 1806, died 6 February 1889)
 The Very Reverend and Hon. Augustus Duncombe, DD (born 2 November 1814, died 26 January 1880), Dean of York 1858–1880.
 Hon. Octavius Duncombe (born 8 April 1817, died 3 December 1879)

Feversham died in July 1841, aged 76, and was succeeded in the barony by his son William. His younger sons Arthur and Octavius were both Conservative politicians who served in Parliament. Lady Feversham died in 1848.

References

 
 Kidd, Charles, Williamson, David (editors). Debrett's Peerage and Baronetage (1990 edition). New York: St Martin's Press, 1990,

External links
 

1764 births
1841 deaths
People educated at Harrow School
Barons in the Peerage of the United Kingdom
Duncombe, Charles
Duncombe, Charles
Duncombe, Charles
Duncombe, Charles
Duncombe, Charles
Duncombe, Charles
Duncombe, Charles
Duncombe, Charles
Duncombe, Charles
UK MPs who were granted peerages
Place of birth missing
Place of death missing
High Sheriffs of Yorkshire
Charles
Peers of the United Kingdom created by George IV